Randolph County School District, also known as Oak Ridge Central Schools (ORC), was a school district based in Randolph County, Arkansas, near Ravenden Springs. The district had elementary and high school divisions.

On July 1, 2004 the district merged with the Williford School District to form the Twin Rivers School District. On July 1, 2010, the Twin Rivers district was dissolved, and both of the district's schools were closed at the time of the dissolution. Sections of the former Randolph County school district were reassigned to the Mammoth Spring, Maynard, Pocahontas, and Sloan-Hendrix districts.

References

Further reading
Maps of the predecessor districts:
  (Download)

External links
 

Education in Randolph County, Arkansas
Defunct school districts in Arkansas
2004 disestablishments in Arkansas
School districts disestablished in 2004